Phalium bandatum, common name the banded bonnet,  is a species of sea snail, a marine gastropod mollusk in the family Cassidae.

There is one subspecies: Phalium bandatum exaratum (Reeve, 1848)

Description
The size of an adult shell varies between 40 mm and 140 mm.

Distribution
This marine species occurs along the coasts of Japan, the Philippines and Northern Australia.

References

External links
 Gastropods.com :Phalium bandatum bandatum Phalium bandatum bandatum; accessed : 22 June 2011

Tonnidae